Issa Momeni (born 1 January 1968) is a retired Iranian wrestler. He competed at the 1996 Summer Olympics in Atlanta, in the men's freestyle 74 kg.

References

External links
 

1968 births
Living people
Iranian male sport wrestlers
Olympic wrestlers of Iran
Wrestlers at the 1996 Summer Olympics